The Rough Neck is a 1919 American silent drama film directed Oscar Apfel and starring Montagu Love, Robert Broderick and Barbara Castleton.

Cast
 Montagu Love as John Masters
 Robert Broderick as Horace Masters
 George De Carlton as Armitage
 Barbara Castleton as Frances
 Frank Mayo as Ellery Dale
 Al Hart as Ryan 
 J. Gunnis Davis as Shark Smith
 Robert Milasch as Toning 
 Holmes Herbert as A Half-Breed Indian

References

Bibliography
 George A. Katchmer. Eighty Silent Film Stars: Biographies and Filmographies of the Obscure to the Well Known. McFarland, 1991.

External links
 

1919 films
1919 drama films
1910s English-language films
American silent feature films
Silent American drama films
American black-and-white films
Films directed by Oscar Apfel
World Film Company films
1910s American films
English-language drama films